Lake Vagula is a lake of Estonia.

See also
List of lakes of Estonia

Vagula
Võru Parish
Vagula